Curtom Records was a record label started in 1968 by Curtis Mayfield and Impressions manager Eddie Thomas. The label's name was a combination of Mayfield's first name and Thomas' last name. Mayfield had previously made attempts at a record label with the "Mayfield" and "Windy C" labels.

It is noted for being one of the first-ever record labels owned by an African-American recording artist.

Curtom was located in Chicago's former RCA studio (at 1 North Wacker Drive), originally acquired by Mayfield for cutting demos. Along with the Impressions' releases and Mayfield's own solo material, artists on or affiliated with Curtom included the Five Stairsteps, Donny Hathaway (principally as a songwriter/orchestration arranger), Linda Clifford, Baby Huey and the Babysitters, Leroy Hutson, the Natural Four, Bobby Whiteside, Holly Maxwell, the Staple Singers, and Mavis Staples' solo efforts. Most of the acts on Curtom's roster were either produced by Mayfield himself or heavily influenced by his style. Eddie Thomas later developed Curtom subsidiary Thomas Records, while Marv Stuart, Mayfield's manager for many years, became a partner in Curtom.

The label went through various changes of distribution - first by Buddah Records, then Warner Bros., RSO Records, and finally Boardwalk Records, before closing for good in 1980 (although the first Curtom 45s were independently distributed).  The Curtom master tapes are now owned by the Warner Music Group and the Mayfield family. All subsequent re-issues have been under Warner's supervision.

See also
 List of record labels

References

External links
Discogs

Curtis Mayfield
American record labels
Record labels established in 1968
Record labels disestablished in 1980
Soul music record labels
Rhythm and blues record labels
1968 establishments in the United States